The 1961 Volta a Catalunya was the 41st edition of the Volta a Catalunya cycle race and was held from 17 September to 24 September 1961. The race started in Montjuïc and finished in Barcelona. The race was won by Henri Duez.

General classification

References

1961
Volta
1961 in Spanish road cycling
September 1961 sports events in Europe